Asia Pacific Airlines is an airline based in Tabubil, Papua New Guinea. It is a subsidiary of National Jet Express. It operates domestic services, as well as flights to Cairns, Australia. Its main base is Tabubil Airport.

History 

The airline was established in 1991 and was registered as Fubilan Air Transport between 1996 and 2000. It has 42 employees and three Bombardier Dash 8 aircraft in Australia and Papua New Guinea.

Fleet 

The Asia Pacific Airlines fleet consists of the following aircraft (as of August 2017):

Destinations 
 Scheduled destinations for Ok Tedi Mine:
Queensland
Cairns (Cairns Airport)
Horn Island (Horn Island Airport)
Papua New Guinea
Tabubil (Tabubil Airport)
Port Moresby (Jacksons Airport)
Lae (Nadzab Airport)
Madang (Madang Airport)
Mount Hagen (Kagamuga Airport)
Goroka (Goroka Airport)
Wewak (Boram Airport)
Hoskins (Hoskins Airport)
Rabaul (Tokua Airport)
Buka (Buka Airport)
Kavieng (Kavieng Airport)
Manus (Momote Airport)
Alotau (Gurney Airport)

References

See also
List of airlines of Papua New Guinea
Airlines of Papua New Guinea
Airlines established in 1991
1991 establishments in Papua New Guinea